Erin Manning is an American photographer, author, educator, and television personality. Her earliest encounter with photography occurred at age seven when she discovered a book entitled The Family of Man.

Career
Manning's photography career began as a commercial, portrait, and stock photographer, as well as working for Getty Images. She specializes in lifestyle imagery for clients such as AT&T, Bank of America, Disney, lifestyle magazines, healthcare organizations and individuals. Erin Manning's appearance as the host of DIY Network's The Whole Picture series from 2005–2009 introduced her as the digital photo expert for the photo enthusiast. Beginning in 2007 Manning partnered with Canon USA, Inc., SanDisk, Adobe, and F.J. Westcott to create educational articles and videos.

She is the author of Portrait and Candid Photography and Make Money With Your Digital Photography, published by John Wiley & Sons Prior to the launch of her TV series, she appeared as the technology and lifestyle expert on DIY Network’s Enable Your Home.

Appearances and Publications

TV
 2006–2010: DIY Network The Whole Picture – 26 episodes.
 2009: E! That Morning Show
 2009: QVC Digital Green Screen Projects
 2007: ABC View From the Bay – Picture Perfect Photos.
 2006: NBC Today Show – Digital Dating, Give it Your Best Shot.
 2006: CBS The Early Show – Taking Perfect Holiday Photos.
 2005: DIY Network Enable Your Home.

Online Training
 2013: LinkedIn Learning – Up and Running with Lighting: Studio Lights and Flash with Erin Manning

 2013: LinkedIn Learning – Up and Running with Lighting: Natural Light with Erin Manning

Books
 Portrait and Candid Photography: Photo Workshop, 2nd Edition (John Wiley & Sons, 2011)
 Make Money with your Digital Photography: Creative Digital Photography (John Wiley & Sons, 2011)
 Portrait and Candid Photography: Photo Workshop (John Wiley & Sons, 2007)

Awards
 2021: Erin Manning Wins Second Silver Telly Award for Educational Video Series. 2013: One Bronze Telly Award for producing, writing, and hosting How to Use the Storyteller App for Crystal Cruises
 2013: One Bronze Telly Award for producing, writing, and hosting How to Take Better Vacation Photos for SanDisk
 2013: One Bronze Telly Award for producing, writing, and hosting Birthday Invitation Photos for FJ Westcott
 2010: One Silver Telly Award for co-producing, writing, and hosting the educational video More Digital Photo Basics.
 2010: One Bronze People's Choice Telly Award for co-producing, writing, and hosting the Erin Manning Home Studio Lighting Kit Educational DVD.
 2010: One Bronze Telly Award for co-producing, writing, and hosting Speaking Tips 2006–2009: Seven Bronze and Two Gold Classic Telly Awards for hosting DIY Network's The Whole Picture'''.

References

External links
 
 Erin Manning TV

Living people
American women photographers
American portrait photographers
American women in business
American television personalities
American women television personalities
Writers from California
Loyola Marymount University alumni
Year of birth missing (living people)
21st-century American women